New York's 31st State Assembly district is one of the 150 districts in the New York State Assembly in the United States. It has been represented by Democrat Khaleel Anderson since 2021.

Geography 
District 31 is located in Queens, comprising the neighborhoods of Far Rockaway, Arvrene, Springfield Gardens, JFK airport, Brookville, and parts of South Ozone Park.

Recent election results

2022

2020

2018

2016

2014

2012

References 

31
Queens, New York